Police Aviation Unit of FARAJA or HAVA FARAJA is the police aviation of Iran, providing aerial support for other branches of Law Enforcement Command of Islamic Republic of Iran such as the Iranian Traffic Police and the Border Guard in pursuit, surveillance and tracking missions. The main base of the unit is the Shahid Ariyafar Airport in the southern part of Tehran.

Aircraft

References 

Police aviation
Law enforcement in Iran
Law Enforcement Command of Islamic Republic of Iran